Once Upon a Texas Train (also known as Texas Guns) is a 1988 American comedy Western television film, directed by Burt Kennedy and starring Willie Nelson and Richard Widmark.

Plot
The movie opens with a train robbery in Texas, but a group of Texas Rangers is waiting for the robbers, and stop them. Twenty years later, the head of the outlaw gang, John Henry Lee, is paroled on good behavior, but the same day he gets out, his brother Charlie Lee and he rob a bank of $20,000 in gold. Viewers then are introduced to his "gang", all of whom are well past their prime.

Captain Oren Hayes, the Texas Ranger who arrested John and ensured his parole, goes after him once more, knowing that he will try to pull off the same robbery he bungled 20 years before. As John gathers his old gang to help him, Hayes does the same. Meanwhile, a group of young outlaws led by Cotton has their own plans for the gold the elderly outlaws have.

Cast 
 Willie Nelson as John Henry Lee
 Richard Widmark as Captain Oren Hayes
 Shaun Cassidy as Cotton (leader of the young outlaws)
 Chuck Connors as Nash Crawford
 Ken Curtis as Kelly Sutton (John Henry's gang) 
 Royal Dano as Nitro Jones (John Henry's gang)
 Jack Elam as Jason Fitch
 Gene Evans as Fargo Parker (John Henry's gang)
 Kevin McCarthy as the Governor
 Dub Taylor as Charlie Lee (John Henry Lee's brother)
 Stuart Whitman as George Asque
 Angie Dickinson as Maggie Hayes
 Jeb Stuart Adams as Billy Bates (young outlaw)
 David Michael O'Neill as John Young (young outlaw) 
 John Calkins as John Brown (young outlaw) 
 Red West as Bates Boley 
 Clare Carey as Meg Boley
 Don Collier as the Warden 
 Dennis Fimple as the Telegrapher 
 Harry Carey, Jr. as Herald Fitch (billed as Harry Carey)
 Hank Worden as the Old Man (in the rest home)

Production
Filming locations included Arizona's Old Tucson Studios and Mescal, Arizona. Scenes involving Willie Nelson were filmed inside a saloon in Mescal on September 21, 1987. Locomotive Number 40, located at the Nevada Northern Railway Museum in Ely, Nevada, was used as the film's train.

Director Burt Kennedy used several aging Western stars from years past as the group of aged Rangers, as well as the outlaw gang - former Rifleman actor Chuck Connors as Nash Crawford, past Cimarron Strip marshal Stuart Whitman as Gentleman George Asque, and former Dakotas deputy Jack Elam as Jason Fitch making up the retired rangers. John Henry Lee's aged gang consisted of former Gunsmoke deputy Festus Hagen (Ken Curtis) as Kelly Sutton and Western character actors Royal Dano as Nitro Jones, Gene Evans as Fargo Parker, and Dub Taylor as John Henry's brother Charlie Lee. Angie Dickinson had also appeared in several Western films and shows. Another veteran actor, Kevin McCarthy, made an appearance as the Governor.

The Texas Rangers characters originally appeared almost 20 years before in the unsold television pilot and TV-movie broadcast in 1969 on ABC, The Over-the-Hill Gang, which was followed by The Over-the-Hill Gang Rides Again (the sequel did not feature the Captain Oren Hayes character) starring Walter Brennan as Nash Crawford, Pat O'Brien as Captain Oren Hayes, Chill Wills as Gentleman George Asque, and Edgar Buchanan as Jason Fitch. Elam had the distinction of appearing as the crooked sheriff in the first Over-The-Hill film and then assuming the role once played by Buchanan two decades later in Texas Train. One difference between this film and The Over-the-Hill Gang is that first movie portrayed the Rangers as too old to hold their own, while Texas Train showed they could still hold their own against younger competition.

Release
Once Upon a Texas Train premiered as a CBS Sunday Movie on CBS on January 3, 1988. The film was the sixth most-watched television program for the week ending January 3, and was also the third-most watched television film of the 1987-88 television season, with 21.2 million viewers.

Reception
Terry Atkinson of the Los Angeles Times wrote that Kennedy "didn't seem to have quite thought out his promising, then faltering, tale. […] But until things go really awry toward the end, Kennedy provides 'Train' with plenty of the same gently satirical humor and authentic big-sky feeling he gave his fine 1969 feature Support Your Local Sheriff! His smoothly professional direction is full of fine touches, enhanced by Ken Lamkin's photography and Warner Leighton's editing."

References

External links
 

1988 television films
1988 Western (genre) films
1980s English-language films
American Western (genre) television films
Films directed by Burt Kennedy
Films scored by Arthur B. Rubinstein
Films set in Texas
Films shot in Arizona
Films shot in Nevada